Sorry Bhai  is an Indian Hindi romance drama film starring Shabana Azmi, Boman Irani, Sanjay Suri, Sharman Joshi and Chitrangada Singh. It was directed by Onir and released on 28 November 2008.

Plot
Siddharth Mathur (Sharman Joshi), a shy young scientist, travels to Mauritius for his elder brother Harsh's (Sanjay Suri)  wedding. Accompanying him is his mother Gayatri (Shabana Azmi), a reluctant traveller since she is angry at Harsh for deciding to get married without consulting them. Also travelling is Siddharth's cheery father Navin (Boman Irani), whose sole entertainment is pulling Gayatri's leg. Harsh, pre-occupied with work, can spend little time with his family and it is left to his fiancée Aaliyah (Chitrangada Singh) to show them around Mauritius before the wedding. However, Ma's anger at Harsh ensures that she takes an instant dislike for Aaliyah, and it is Aaliyah and Siddharth who end up spending loads of time together. This, added to the fact that Aaliyah feels neglected by the career-obsessed Harsh, leads to them being irresistibly drawn to each other. A horrified Siddharth battles this attraction desperately, but Aaliyah has fallen madly in love and pursues him with single-minded determination. When Siddharth's defences start crumbling and Ma starts getting suspicious, all hell breaks loose in the Mathur family.

Cast
 Sharman Joshi as Siddharth Mathur
 Chitrangada Singh as Aaliyah
 Shabana Azmi as Gayatri Devi Mathur 
 Sanjay Suri as Harshvardhan Mathur
 Boman Irani as Navin Mathur 
 Gaurav Nanda as Student

Soundtrack

References

External links
 

2000s Hindi-language films
2008 films
Films set in Mauritius